Trevor Edward Jesty (born 2 June 1948) is an English former cricketer and cricket umpire. As a player he was an all rounder (a right-handed batsman and medium-pace bowler) who played 490 first-class matches, scoring 21,916 runs and taking 585 wickets, between 1966 and 1991.

Jesty was born in Gosport, Hampshire, and played for Hampshire, Surrey, and Lancashire in the English County Championship. He played overseas for Border and Griqualand West in South Africa, and Canterbury in New Zealand.

Jesty helped Hampshire to win the 1973 County Championship, taking 35 wickets at an average of 20 (although less successful with the bat that year), and the John Player League in 1975 and 1978.

Jesty played 10 one-day internationals for England, most of them during the Benson & Hedges World Series Cup tournament in 1983. His highlight was scoring 52* off 35 balls against New Zealand at Adelaide. He was named in the England squad for the 1983 World Cup (although not playing in any of the matches). He was named as one of the five Wisden Cricketers of the Year in 1983 for his performances during the 1982 English cricket season, during which he scored 1645 runs at 58.75, including eight hundreds, and took 31 wickets. In 1983 he made 166 not out, his highest score in limited-over cricket, in a John Player League match again Surrey, sharing in an unbroken second-wicket stand of 269 with Gordon Greenidge.  

After playing 340 games for Hampshire, Jesty moved to Surrey for the 1985 season, apparently in part because he was passed over for the Hampshire captaincy in favour of Mark Nicholas. Jesty played for Surrey for the next three seasons.  While at Surrey he made 112 in a NatWest Trophy semi final against Lancashire in 1986, finishing narrowly on the losing side. 

Jesty moved to Lancashire for the 1988 season. Into his forties he helped Lancashire to win the Refuge Assurance Cup in 1988, top-scoring in the final against Worcestershire, and the Refuge Assurance League in 1989. He was still at the county during its success in 1990, although appearing more in Refuge Assurance League fixtures.

In total Jesty scored 1,000 runs in a first-class season 10 times.

Following his retirement as a player, Jesty became a cricket umpire in England, and served as the reserve umpire for the Fourth Test Match at The Oval between England and Pakistan in 2006. In 2007 he umpired in the unauthorised Indian Cricket League.  He continued as a first-class umpire until his retirement in 2013.

References

External links

1948 births
Living people
English cricketers
England One Day International cricketers
Border cricketers
Canterbury cricketers
Griqualand West cricketers
Hampshire cricketers
Lancashire cricketers
Surrey cricketers
Wisden Cricketers of the Year
English cricket umpires
People from Gosport
Marylebone Cricket Club cricketers